Elias coding is a term used for one of two types of lossless coding schemes used in digital communications:

 Shannon–Fano–Elias coding, a precursor to arithmetic coding, in which probabilities are used to determine codewords
 Universal coding using one of Elias' three universal codes, each with predetermined codewords:
 Elias delta coding
 Elias gamma coding
 Elias omega coding